Hydrogen Energy California (HECA) was an alternative energy, hydrogen power project in development with support from the U.S. Department of Energy in Kern County, California.
The facility proposed to convert coal and refinery waste into an impure hydrogen fuel that would be used to generate electricity and fertilizer.  HECA was supposed to capture ninety percent of its carbon dioxide (CO2) emissions to theoretically minimize greenhouse gas (GHG) emissions and inject it, for enhanced oil recovery.   
If it had become fully operational, HECA would have generated nearly 300MW of clean electricity and will produce one million tons of locally manufactured, low-carbon fertilizer. But, most of the electricity produced by HECA would have been consumed by the different processes at the plant.
On March 4, 2016, the California Energy Commission ordered the HECA application to be terminated.

HECA would have produced over 500 tons of criteria air pollutants. This air pollution would have been added to an area that already has the worst air pollution in the entire United States.

The site is near the Elk Hills Oil Field where the captured CO2 was to be used for enhanced oil recovery by Occidental of Elk Hills, Inc. HECA would have employed an expected 2,000 union workers to construct the facility and would have created approximately 200 permanent jobs.

HECA was a project of SCS Energy LLC, an independent developer of clean power. HECA was cofunded by the U.S. Department of Energy’s Office of Fossil Energy  and administered by the National Energy Technology Laboratory. The HECA project was awarded a $408 million grant by the U.S. Department of Energy under Clean Coal Power Initiative Round 3.

Process
The HECA project will be an Integrated Gasification Combined Cycle (IGCC) facility using Mitsubishi Heavy Industries, Ltd.’s oxygen–blown gasifier technology.  IGCC technology allows for highly efficient power generation with minimal emissions.  IGGC facilities, including HECA, are different from conventional fossil fueled power generation plants in that there is no combustion of the actual fossil fuels.  Instead, HECA converts, through gasification, a blend of recycled petroleum coke, a low value by-product that comes from oil refining, and coal to manufacture hydrogen fuel.

The clean burning hydrogen fuel will be used for two purposes:  to generate low-carbon electricity; and to produce approximately one million tons of low-carbon fertilizer per year.

A Rectisol acid gas removal system will separate and capture more than ninety percent of the carbon dioxide (CO2) produced during the hydrogen manufacturing process. Most of the captured CO2 will be used for enhanced oil recovery at the nearby Elk Hills Oil Field, enabling the production of millions of additional barrels of domestic oil, a 10-20% increase in the amount of oil recovered. Some of the CO2 will be used in the manufacturing of fertilizer. The project will use brackish groundwater for its process water needs and will have a Zero Liquid Discharge (ZLD) system in order to protect and conserve local freshwater sources.

Schedule
The project was currently progressing through the regulatory approval process, and was expected to be completed and operating by 2017. But, the project has now been terminated by the California Energy Commission for lack of progress.

External links
 Hydrogen Energy California information
 Hydrogen Energy California website
 HECA Project Facts
 HECA Project Description

References

Hydrogen economy
Energy infrastructure in California
Power stations in California